Leonard Bernard Hosley (born December 10, 1973) is a former American football defensive tackle in the National Football League for the New York Giants, Indianapolis Colts, New England Patriots, and the Washington Redskins.  He played college football at Duke University. Currently coaches high school football in Wittenberg, Wisconsin.

Early life
Born in Cave Spring, Georgia, Holsey attended Coosa High School in Rome, Georgia, where he was a letterman in football and basketball.

Currently he is the head football coach at Wittenberg-Birnamwood High School in Wittenberg, Wisconsin. According to the Wausau Daily Herald.

References

1973 births
Living people
Sportspeople from Rome, Georgia
American football defensive tackles
Duke Blue Devils football players
New York Giants players
Indianapolis Colts players
Dallas Desperados players
New England Patriots players
Washington Redskins players
Utah Blaze players
Austin Wranglers players
Orlando Predators players